The 2017 Japanese Formula 3 Championship was  the 39th Japanese Formula 3 Championship season.

Teams and drivers

Race calendar
Calendar for the 2017 season.

Championship standings

Drivers' Championships
Points are awarded as follows:

Overall

National Class

References

External links
  

Japanese Formula 3 Championship seasons
Formula Three
Japan Formula Three
Japanese Formula 3